The Assistant Secretary of the Treasury for Economic Policy is the head of the Office of Economic Policy in the United States Department of the Treasury. The position is held by Ben Harris. President Joe Biden announced he would nominate Ben Harris to the role on March 11, 2021. Harris was confirmed by the Senate on November 3, 2021 and sworn-in on November 15, 2021

According to U.S. statute, there are ten Assistant Secretaries of the Treasury appointed by the President of the United States with the advice and consent of the United States Senate.  The Assistant Secretary of the Treasury for Economic Policy reports directly to the United States Secretary of the Treasury and the United States Deputy Secretary of the Treasury.

List of Assistant Secretaries of the Treasury for Economic Policy

See also
 Assistant Secretary of the Treasury

References

 United States Department of the Treasury. History of the Office of Economic Policy. Accessed Jan. 11, 2014.